"What You See Is What You Get" is the first single by duo Stoney & Meatloaf. It was released ahead of the release of the duo's only album Stoney & Meatloaf in 1971.

Track listing
 "What You See Is What You Get"
 "Lady Be Mine" (edit)

Charts

References

Meat Loaf songs
1971 debut singles
Funk rock songs
1971 songs